Urumqi Foreign Economic Relations and Trade Fair, commonly abbreviated as Urumqi Fair, is an annual trade fair held in Urumqi of Xinjiang, China, since it was started on September 2, 1992. Its purpose is to promote trading and market exploration in Northwestern China with foreign countries mainly in Central Asia. Urumqi Fair is the largest trade fair in Western China. 

During the 17th Urumqi fair in September 2008, it was the first time that the fair saw participants from the Ministry of Commerce and the China Council for Promotion of International Trade.  The last fair was held in 2010 before the event was upgraded to become the first China-Eurasia Expo in 2011.

See also
 Canton Fair

External links
 Official website

References

Ürümqi
Trade fairs in China
Recurring events established in 1992
1992 establishments in China
2010 disestablishments in China